Anne-Marie Kermarrec (born 1970) is a French computer scientist. She is Professor at EPFL (École Polytechnique Fédérale de Lausanne), where she heads the Scalable Computing Systems Laboratory at the School of Computer and Communication Sciences. Her research concerns distributed computing, epidemic algorithms, peer-to-peer networks, and systematic support for machine learning.

Previously she was director of research at INRIA in Rennes.

In 2015, she founded Mediego, a startup company that provides systems for real-time online content personalization.

Recognition

She was elected to the Academia Europaea in 2013. In 2017 she became a Fellow of the Association for Computing Machinery.

References

External links
 

Living people
French computer scientists
French women computer scientists
Fellows of the Association for Computing Machinery
Members of Academia Europaea
1970 births